Floating on a Dream is the debut studio album by American singer-songwriter Avi Kaplan, released on May 20, 2022, through Fantasy Records. It is Kaplan's first studio album since his departure from the a cappella group Pentatonix in 2017. The album is entirely produced by Shooter Jennings, and features a guest appearance from Joy Williams.

Background 
On May 12, 2017, Avi Kaplan announced that he would be leaving the a cappella group Pentatonix after six years. In a video announcing his departure, Kaplan stated that although he enjoyed being in the group, he found it difficult to keep up with their schedule, which required him to spend less time with his family. His final show with the group was held at the Champlain Valley Fair in Essex Junction, Vermont on September 3.

Before his announcement, Kaplan began releasing music as an independent artist under the name Avriel & the Sequoias. His debut solo project Sage and Stone was released on June 9, 2017. After leaving Pentatonix, Kaplan parted ways with their label RCA Records and continued to release solo music. On November 5, 2019, he announced his second solo project I'll Get By, which was scheduled to be released on January 24, 2020. Its release was delayed to February 28 due to Kaplan signing with Fantasy Records.

On November 15, 2021, Kaplan released the album's lead single "First Place I Go". He formally announced his debut studio album and released its second single, "All Is Well" featuring singer Joy Williams, on February 15, 2022.

Critical reception 
In a positive review, Mark Engleson of Entertainment Focus praised Kaplan's "incredible voice; it’s going to stand out on any project he does. His songwriting and the production here serve to bring out its deep emotional power, making a for highly listenable and enjoyable album."

Track listing 
All tracks are produced by Shooter Jennings.

Personnel 
Credits adapted from Fantasy Records.

Musicians

 Avi Kaplan – vocals, guitar
 Aubrey Richmond – violin
 Chris Masterson – guitars
 Daniel Ellsworth – piano, organ, synthesizer
 Jamie Douglass – drums, percussion
 John Schreffler, Jr. – pedal steel
 Joy Williams – featured vocals 
 Kaleb Jones – guitar
 Smith Curry – pedal steel
 Ted Russell Kamp – bass
Technical

 Shooter Jennings – production
 David Spreng – recording, engineering 
 Trina Shoemaker – mixing
 Pete Lyman – mastering

References 

2022 debut albums
Albums produced by Shooter Jennings
Fantasy Records albums
Americana albums